The men's 5000 meter at the 2022 KNSB Dutch Single Distance Championships took place in Heerenveen at the Thialf ice skating rink on Friday 29 October 2021. There were 20 participants. Although the tournament was held in 2021 it was the 2022 edition as it was part of the 2021–2022 speed skating season. The first 5 skaters were eligible for the following World Cup tournaments.

Statistics

Result

Referee: Bert Timmerman.  Assistant: Wil Schildacht  Starter: Jan Rosing 
Start: 18:56.00 hr. Finish: 20:29.40 hr.

Source:

Draw

References

Single Distance Championships
2022 Single Distance